Gerald Miller may refer to:

 Gerald Miller (missionary) (born 1937), Mennonite medical missionary
 Gerald L. Miller (born 1942), United States Marine Corps general
 Gerald A. Miller (born 1943), American agronomist and professor
 Gerald E. Miller (1919–2014), United States Navy admiral
 Gerald R. Miller (1931–1993), American professor and author

See also
Gerry Miller (disambiguation)
Jerry Miller (disambiguation)